Edward Fenwick Dickinson (January 21, 1829 – August 25, 1891) was a U.S. Representative from Ohio for one term from 1869 to 1871. He was the son of Rodolphus Dickinson.

Biography 
Born in Fremont, Ohio, the son of Rodolphus Dickinson and Marguerite Beaugrand Dickinson, Dickinson attended the public schools. He graduated from St. Xavier College, Cincinnati, Ohio, where he had studied law. After he was admitted to the bar, he commenced practice in Fremont, Ohio. Dickinson served as prosecuting attorney of Sandusky County, Ohio from 1852 until his resignation two years later.

On 1852 he married Henrietta R. Mitchner. They had three children.

During the Civil War, he served in the Union Army as a lieutenant. Later, he was promoted to captain and served as regimental quartermaster of Company G, Eighth Regiment, Ohio Volunteer Infantry. When the war ended, Dickinson became a probate judge of Sandusky County from 1866 until 1869.

Dickinson was elected as a Democrat to the Forty-first Congress (March 4, 1869 – March 3, 1871). However, he was an unsuccessful candidate for reelection in 1870. Because of this, he resumed the practice of his profession.

Dickinson was elected mayor of Fremont in 1871, 1873 and 1875. He again served as probate judge of Sandusky County from 1877 to 1879 and from 1885 until his death. He died in Fremont, Ohio in 1891 and was interred in Oakwood Cemetery.

Sources

1829 births
1891 deaths
People from Fremont, Ohio
Union Army officers
Xavier University alumni
County district attorneys in Ohio
People of Ohio in the American Civil War
Ohio state court judges
Mayors of places in Ohio
Probate court judges in the United States
Democratic Party members of the United States House of Representatives from Ohio
19th-century American politicians
19th-century American judges